Yevhen Semenenko (born 17 July 1984) is a Ukrainian triple jumper.

He finished twelfth at the 2006 European Championships. He also competed at the 2009 European Indoor Championships, but without reaching the final.

His personal best jump is 17.03 metres, achieved during the qualifying round at the 2006 European Championships. He equalled the mark in July 2008 in Kyiv.

Competition record

References

1984 births
Living people
Ukrainian male triple jumpers